Knapp Creek is a rural locality in the Scenic Rim Region, Queensland, Australia.

Geography 
The locality is named after Knapps Creek, a tributary of the Logan River.

The locality has the following mountains:
  Knapps Peak (Miggun, Mount Hughes), in the south-west of the locality 
 Prouts Hill, in the south-east of the locality

History 
Knapps Creek Provisional School opened circa 1884. On 1 January 1909 it became Knapps Creek State School, but then  closed in 1910.

In 1979, Knapp Creek Environmental Park 
was gazetted under the Land Act of 1962.

In the ,Knapp Creek had a population of 59 people. The locality contains 29 households, in which 41.8% of the population are males and 58.2% of the population are females with a median age of 49, 11 years above the national average. The average weekly household income is $1,875, $437 above the national average.

References

External links 

Scenic Rim Region
Localities in Queensland